The Itaipava São Paulo Indy 300 presented by Nestlé was the fourth race of the 2011 IZOD IndyCar Series season. The race took place on May 1 and 2, on the  temporary street circuit in São Paulo, Brazil, and was telecasted by Versus in the United States and TV Bandeirantes in Brazil. After a rain delay that lasted almost two and a half hours, attempts to run the event in full on the Sunday were scrapped with the race completed on Monday May 2.

Report

Classification

Qualifying
 All cars were split into two groups of twelve, with the fastest six from each group going through to the "top 12" session. In this session, the fastest six cars progressed to the "Firestone Fast Six." The fastest driver in the final session claimed pole, with the rest of the cars lining up in session order, regardless of qualifying times. (fast six from 1–6, top 12 from 7–12 and round 1 from 13–24, with group 1 drivers occupying the odd–numbered grid positions, and group 2 drivers occupying the even–numbered grid positions.

Race

NOTE:  Under agreement from race organisers, INDYCAR, and Brazilian television rights holder Rede Bandeirantes, there is a two-hour time limit for this race.  The first 14 laps from Sunday took 40:46 to run, and that time was deducted from Monday morning's race.  The Monday race featured a 1:19:14 timed race (the remaining time from Sunday's race limit).

Championship standings after the race

Drivers' Championship standings

 Note: Only the top five positions are included.

References

External links
IndyCar Results Page

Sao Paulo Indy 300
São Paulo Indy 300
Sao Paulo Indy 300
Sao Paulo Indy 300